Faridkot House is the former residence of the Maharajah of Faridkot in Delhi. It is located on Copernicus Marg, next to the Baroda House.

The palace is constructed in the art deco style.

In a court battle that took over 20 years, the daughters of Maharajah Sir Harinder Singh Brar won the will and received Rs. 200 billion (US$4.4 billion), which includes Faridkot House.

References 

Royal residences in Delhi